Kirk Field  is a city-owned public-use airport located one nautical mile (2 km) northwest of the central business district of Paragould, in Greene County, Arkansas, United States.

This airport is included in the FAA's National Plan of Integrated Airport Systems for 2011–2015, which categorized it as a general aviation facility.

Facilities and aircraft 
Kirk Field covers an area of 220 acres (89 ha) at an elevation of 290 feet (88 m) above mean sea level. It has two runways: 4/22 is 4,500 by 75 feet (1,372 x 23 m) with an asphalt surface; 8/26 is 2,792 by 100 feet (851 x 30 m) with a turf surface.

For the 12-month period ending August 31, 2008, the airport had 13,000 aircraft operations, an average of 35 per day: 85% general aviation and 15% air taxi. At that time there were 30 aircraft based at this airport: 90% single-engine, 7% multi-engine and 3% helicopter.

References

External links 
 Kirk Field at Paragould Regional Chamber of Commerce
 Aerial image as of 28 February 2001 from USGS The National Map
 

Airports in Arkansas
Transportation in Greene County, Arkansas